Lucas K. "Luke" Duke is a fictional character in the American television series The Dukes of Hazzard which ran from 1979 to 1985. Luke was played by Tom Wopat.

Luke and his younger cousin Bo Duke live in an unincorporated area of the fictional Hazzard County, in Georgia. Luke and Bo own a 1969 Dodge Charger, nicknamed The General Lee, which is painted orange, with the Confederate Flag on top, and 01 painted on the sides. Luke and Bo evade the corrupt politicians of Hazzard County, such as Boss Hogg, Sheriff Rosco P. Coltrane, and the sheriff's deputies. 

The Duke family, including cousin Daisy Duke and Uncle Jesse Duke, was well known for their role in the moonshine business among other interests. Bo and Luke had both been sentenced to probation for illegal transportation of moonshine. As a result, neither was permitted to use firearms, instead preferring to use bow and arrows. The terms of Bo and Luke's probation included staying within the boundaries of Hazzard County (unless given special permission by their Probation Officer, who happened to be Boss Hogg). Prior to the start of the show, Luke served as a Sergeant in the U.S. Marine Corps.

Luke's famous "hood slide" (as seen in the opening credits, originating from the second episode, "Daisy's Song") is the trick most commonly associated with the character. In a subsequent TV interview, Tom Wopat admitted that the move was actually a mistake; it originated when he was trying to vault over the car to get to the passenger side and his foot accidentally caught the edge of the hood, causing his leg to slide across it.  The move eventually caught on and became the character's hallmark. Additionally, in this initial slide, Wopat caught his hand on the hood radio aerial, leading to the aerial being removed from all later examples of the car to avoid risk of injury.

In the pilot episode of the series, Bo commented that Luke was probably the father of at least two of the children who live at the Hazzard County Orphanage.

Luke later left Hazzard County, along with his cousin Bo, to join the NASCAR circuit. His cousin Vance replaced him during that time.

According to the 1997 film The Dukes of Hazzard: Reunion!, Luke eventually would leave Hazzard for good, and put his military training to good use by becoming a fire jumper for the U.S. Forest Service. During training in Montana, he met and fell in love with a woman named Anita Blackwell, who was a talented singer. He convinced her to leave to pursue her dreams, and she became a successful country music star. Luke met her again in The Dukes of Hazzard: Hazzard in Hollywood, although by then she was married to another man.

Luke Duke was later played by Johnny Knoxville in the subsequent cinematic version and Randy Wayne in the prequel television film, The Dukes of Hazzard: The Beginning.

References

External links

The Dukes of Hazzard characters
Fictional United States Marine Corps personnel
Fictional military sergeants
Fictional archers
Fictional characters from Georgia (U.S. state)
Fictional boxers
Television characters introduced in 1979
Comedy television characters
Fictional racing drivers